First Tee is a 501(c)(3) nonprofit organization that teaches children life and social skills via golf lessons. First Tee teaches more than 3.6 million youth annually through programs delivered at chapter program locations, in schools and at youth centers across the country and international locations. 

PGA Tour commissioner Jay Monahan serves as chairman of the board of governors, which is composed of business leaders. Former President George W. Bush serves as the honorary chair; he succeeded his father, former President George H. W. Bush, who served from 1997–2010.

History
First Tee was founded in 1997. Led by PGA Tour Commissioner Tim Finchem, the organization started as a partnership among the PGA Tour, PGA of America, LPGA, USGA and the Masters Tournament Foundation. Initially, First Tee was affiliated with the World Golf Foundation. 

In 2019, First Tee made the transition to a new nonprofit entity, PGA Tour First Tee Foundation.

Chapters
The participants of First Tee are children aged 5–18. Participants progress through the program over time. More than 400 PGA and LPGA teaching professionals and 15,000 volunteers help the participants through First Tee. 

Chapters offer full scholarships or reduced fee programming for those with financial need.

Participant opportunities
With First Tee, teens have the opportunity to participate in national leadership events, scholarship programs and such. 

The PURE Insurance Championship Impacting the First Tee is one of the national participant events. This PGA Tour Champions event is played annually in September at the Pebble Beach Golf Links and Poppy Hills Golf Club.

Also, First Tee launched a college scholarship program in 2020 where scholars receive professional development workshops and assistance with internships and full-time employment placement post-graduation.

First Tee School Program 
Since 2004, First Tee has trained educators at more than 10,000 elementary schools to teach their curriculum in physical education courses.

First Tee Community Program 
The First Tee Community Program partners with youth centers like the YMCA and Boys and Girls Club to teach children how to play golf.

References

External links 
 First Tee

Golf associations
Sports charities
Organizations established in 1997
Charities based in Florida
Youth organizations based in Florida